Peredel is a rural locality (a village) in Muromtsevskoye Rural Settlement, Sudogodsky District, Vladimir Oblast, Russia. The population was 32 as of 2010.

Geography 
Peredel is located 11 km southeast of Sudogda (the district's administrative centre) by road. Peredel (settlement) is the nearest rural locality.

References 

Rural localities in Sudogodsky District